Whitstone School is a specialist school located in Shepton Mallet, Somerset, England, and educates students aged between 11 and 16. The school has been a specialist Technology College since 2000; the school's headteacher is Guy Swallow. 
In August 2011, the school became an academy, and in 2022 the school roll was 535 students.

Academic performance
Since 2019, the school's GCSE performance has been well below the average of other schools in Somerset,
however during its first full year as an academy, performance increased from 44% to 56% of students achieving five or more A* to C GCSE grades including English and mathematics.
In 2017, it was assessed by Ofsted as "good" on a four-point scale of outstanding, good, requires improvement, or inadequate.

Houses
The school has a house system. Currently, there are 4 houses: Quantock (Blue), Polden (Red), Blackdown (Yellow), and Mendip (Green). These house names are named after ranges of hills in the Somerset area, three of which are Areas of Outstanding Natural Beauty. Each house colour is reflected on the school uniform.

References

External links
 

Educational institutions established in the 1940s
Educational institutions with year of establishment missing
Academies in Somerset
Secondary schools in Somerset
Shepton Mallet